Ernst Teofil Skarstedt (April 14, 1857 – March 13, 1929) was a Swedish-American author, journalist and editor of Swedish-language books and newspapers. He is most noted as the author of a three-volume trilogy covering the Swedish immigrant experience in the Pacific Northwest.

Background
Ernst Teofil Skarstedt was born in Solberga parish, municipality of Kungälv, in Västra Götaland County, located in the traditional province of Bohuslän, Sweden.  He was the son of Carl Wilhelm Skarstedt (1815–1908) and Hedvig Elina Wieselgren (1839–1863). Skarstedt was born at the parsonage where his father served as a parish priest. His father later became a distinguished professor of theology at Lund University. His younger brother was Swedish journalist and politician Carl Abraham Waldemar Skarstedt (1861–1931).

Career
Skarstedt graduated from Lund University in 1877.
He emigrated to the United States in 1878.  Skarstedt became the co-editor of Svenska amerikanaren in 1880 and Svenska tribunen in 1884, both published in Chicago. From 1891 he edited Vestkusten, published in San Francisco. He was later hired as the  editor of Nordstjernan in New York City. Later having moved to Portland, Oregon, Skarstedt made an attempt to publish a local Swedish-language newspaper, Demokraten, a newspaper aimed at educating Swedes about local politics.

In 1890, Skarstedt published Oregon och Washington: Dessa staters historia, resurser och folkliv, a volume that combined history with a handbook for potential settlers. Washington och dess Svenska Befolkning was published in 1908. This  provided a history of the area and descriptions of communities and industries. In 1911, he published the last volume in his trilogy Oregon och dess svenska befolkning containing biographies of prominent Swedish-Americans.

Ernst Skarstedt died in Seattle, Washington, during 1929.

Selected works
	Svensk-amerikanska poeter i ord och bild (1890) 
	Oregon och Washington (1890) 
	Våra pennfäktare (1897) 
	Under västliga skyar, poetry (1907) 
	Washington och dess svenska befolkning (1908) 
	California och dess Svenska Befolkning (1910) 
	Oregon och dess svenska befolkning (1911) 
	Vagabond och redaktör  (1914) 
	Svensk-amerikanska folket i helg och söcken (1917)

References

Other sources

Nordström, Lars  (2008)  Swedish Oregon (Portland, OR: Swedish Roots in Oregon Press) 
Rosqvist, Leif  (2008) The Great History of Swedes in Oregon (Portland, OR: Swedish Roots in Oregon Press)

Related reading
 Barton, H. Arnold (1994) A Folk Divided: Homeland Swedes and Swedish Americans, 1840-1940 (Southern Illinois University Press) 
Benson, Arnold B. (1938) Swedes in America, 1638-1938 with Naboth Hedin (New York: Haskell House Publishers)

External links
 Ernst Skarstedt and Ellen Hogberg Skarstedt, Seattle, July 1926

1857 births
1929 deaths
People from Kungälv Municipality
Lund University alumni
Writers from Oregon
Writers from Washington (state)
19th-century American newspaper publishers (people)
Swedish emigrants to the United States